Telluride is the county seat and most populous town of San Miguel County in the southwestern portion of the U.S. state of Colorado.  The town is a former silver mining camp on the San Miguel River in the western San Juan Mountains. The first gold mining claim was made in the mountains above Telluride in 1875, and early settlement of what is now Telluride followed. The town was founded in 1878 as "Columbia", but due to confusion with a California town of the same name, was renamed Telluride in 1887 for the gold telluride minerals found in other parts of Colorado. These telluride minerals were never found near Telluride, but the area's mines for some years provided zinc, lead, copper, silver, and other gold ores.

Telluride sits in a box canyon. Steep forested mountains and cliffs surround it, with Bridal Veil Falls situated at the canyon's head. Numerous weathered ruins of old mining operations dot the hillsides. A free gondola connects the town with its companion town, Mountain Village, Colorado, at the base of the ski area. Telluride and the surrounding area have featured prominently in popular culture, and it is the subject of several popular songs. It is especially known for its ski resort and slopes during the winter, as well as an extensive festival schedule during the summer, including the Hot Air Balloon Festival, which traditionally occurs the first weekend in June.

The Telluride Historic District, which includes a significant portion of the town, is listed on the National Register of Historic Places and is also one of Colorado's 20 National Historic Landmarks. The town population was 2,607 in the 2020 United States Census.

History

Mining days
Gold was first discovered in Colorado near present-day Denver, setting off the Pike's Peak gold rush of 1858. The Smuggler gold vein above Telluride, and placer gold in the San Miguel River, were discovered in 1875.  John Fallon made the first claim in Marshal Basin above Telluride in 1875 and early settlement of Telluride followed. The town was founded in 1878. Telluride was originally named "Columbia", but due to confusion with Columbia, California, the name was changed by the post office in 1887. The town was named after valuable ore compounds of the chemical element tellurium, a metalloid element which forms natural tellurides, the most notable of which are telluride ores of gold and silver. Although gold telluride minerals were never actually found in the mountains near Telluride, the area's mines were rich in zinc, lead, copper, silver, and ores which contained gold in other forms.

Telluride began slowly because of its isolated location. In 1881, a toll road was opened by Otto Mears, which allowed wagons to go where only pack mules could go before. This increased the number of people in Telluride, but it was still expensive to get gold-rich ore out of the valley.

In June 1889, Butch Cassidy, before becoming associated with his gang, the "Wild Bunch", robbed the San Miguel Valley Bank in Telluride. This was his first major recorded crime. He exited the bank with $24,580 and later became famous as a bank robber.

In 1891, the Rio Grande Southern Railroad, also begun by Mears, arrived in Telluride, eventually building a two-stall engine house, water facilities, a section house and a bunkhouse, sidings, and a depot. It continued further up the valley to end its Telluride branch at Pandora, serving the mines and the town until 1952. The cheaper and consistent transportation for passengers and freight allowed miners and goods to flow into the San Miguel town and ore to flow out to the mills and foundries elsewhere. This brought a brief but unprecedented boom to Telluride before the Panic of 1893.

Around the turn of the 20th century, there were serious labor disputes in the mines near Telluride. The Colorado National Guard was called out and there were deaths on both sides. Unions were formed as miners joined the Western Federation of Miners in 1896. 1899 brought big changes as union strike action led most mines to grant miners $3 a day for an 8-hour day's work plus a boarding pay of $1 a day. At this time, workers were putting in 10- to 12-hour days and the mines ran 24 hours a day. Work conditions were treacherous, with mines above , a lack of safety measures, and bitter weather in winter months. Even the boarding houses were precariously placed on the mountainsides.

Telluride's labor unrest occurred against the backdrop of a statewide struggle between miners and mine owners. Bulkeley Wells was one mine operator considerably hostile to the union. The Telluride Miners' Union was led by Vincent St. John. The disappearance of mine guard William J. Barney, which Wells declared a "murder", created much intrigue and national interest. The accusations, animosity, gunplay, and expulsions that followed were part of an ongoing struggle throughout Colorado's mining communities which came to be called the Colorado Labor Wars.

In 1891, Telluride's L. L. Nunn joined forces with George Westinghouse to build the Ames Hydroelectric Generating Plant, an alternating current power station, near Telluride. This was the first successful demonstration of long-distance transmission of industrial-grade alternating current power and used two  Westinghouse alternators, one working as a generator producing 3,000 volts, 133 Hertz, single-phase AC, and the other used as an AC motor. This hydroelectric AC power plant predated the Westinghouse plant at Niagara Falls by four years. Nunn and his brother Paul built power plants in Colorado, Utah, Idaho, Montana, Mexico, and the Ontario Power plant at Niagara Falls on the Canadian side. Nunn developed a keen interest in education as part of his electrical power companies, and in conjunction with Cornell University built the Telluride House at Cornell in 1909 to educate promising students in electrical engineering. Later, Nunn along with Charles Walcott, started the non-profit Telluride Association. Nunn founded Deep Springs College in 1917. Each year, the Telluride Tech Festival honors Nunn, inventor Nikola Tesla, and Westinghouse, along with current-day technology and science leaders.

Telluride's most famous historic mines are the Tomboy, Pandora, Smuggler-Union, Nellie, and Sheridan mines. Beginning in 1939, the hard-rock mining operations in the Red Mountain and Telluride mining districts began a lengthy consolidation under the Idarado Mining Company (Idarado), now a division of Newmont Mining. The consolidation ended in 1953 with Idarado's acquisition of the Telluride Mines. Idarado kept the underground workings and mill operations open at Telluride's Pandora hard-rock mine until 1978. When the mine officially closed, the snow which tormented Telluride's miners became the town's new source of income, in the form of skiing and tourism. The documentary video "the YX factor" chronicles the transition from mining to skiing and the influx of "hippies" in the late 1960s and early 1970s in the words of local residents and commentators such as Peter Yarrow and Tom Hayden.

Skiing era
Mining was Telluride's only industry until 1972 when the first ski lift was installed by Telluride Ski Resort founder Joseph T. Zoline and his Telluride Ski Corporation (Telco). Zoline bought the land for the future resort in 1969 and began to craft the slopes. Along with his mountain manager, Telluride native Bill "Sr." Mahoney, they slowly and thoughtfully put together a plan for the sustained development of Telluride and the region. As mining phased out and a new service industry phased in, the local population changed sharply. Mining families fled Telluride to settle in places like Moab, Utah, where uranium mining offered hope of continued employment. Mining families were replaced by what locals referred to as "hippies", young people with a 1960s worldview that often clashed with the values of Telluride's old-timers. These newcomers were characterized as idle "trust funders" drawn to the town for a casual lifestyle and outdoor excitements such as hang gliding, mountain climbing, and kayaking.

The new population opposed town growth and economic expansion, including growth due to tourism and skiing. At one point, a serious effort was made to ban cars from the city limits and force visitors to use horse-drawn carts. The 1970s had fluctuating snowfalls and economic recession, but the town's music and film festivals flourished. They exposed hundreds of thousands to the grandeur of the valley for the first time and created iconic associations with elite entertainers. Meanwhile, ski area founder Joe Zoline worked to develop one of the best mountains in North America for expert skiers, and created the infrastructure for tourism that respected Telluride's need to stay small.

As the final ore carts were rolling out of the Pandora mine, tourists began to discover Telluride's views, skiing, and autumn color changes. After the brutal snow drought of 1976 nearly wiped out the embryonic ski and lodging industry, the town started to rebound economically. In 1978, Ron Allred and his partner Jim Wells bought a stake in the ski area to form the Telluride Company. They expanded the infrastructure by adding a gondola connecting Telluride with the Mountain Village.

In 1971 the Telluride Council for the Arts and Humanities (TCAH) was founded and organized by Scott Brown, Chris Gertz and Burk Thompson, and fellow local arts and craftspeople following a sidewalk arts show on Main Street. TCAH also founded over the years several festivals which include: The Telluride Film Festival; Telluride Bluegrass Festival; Telluride Mountainfilm Festival; Telluride Tech Festival; Telluride Jazz Festival; Telluride Chamber Music Festival and the Countdown to New Years held in front of the San Miguel County Courthouse to welcome in the New Year at Midnight on Main Street.

The Grateful Dead played Telluride on August 16 and 17, 1987, riding the recent success of In the Dark.

During the 1980s, Telluride developed a reputation as "Colorado's best-kept secret", which paradoxically made it one of the better-known resort communities. Wealthy skiers flocked to the mountain all winter, and sightseers kept hotel rooms full all summer. Telluride also became notorious in the drug counterculture as a drop point for Mexican smugglers and a favorite place for wealthy importers to enjoy downtime. The town was even featured in the hit song by Glenn Frey from Miami Vice, "Smugglers Blues". Telluride was living up to its Wild West history. This type of attention helped differentiate it from Aspen. The festivals and Telluride's bad-boy image attracted celebrities like Tom Cruise, Oprah Winfrey, and Oliver Stone. By the mid-1990s, Telluride had shed both its mining personality and drug image to establish itself as a premier resort town balancing modern culture with fascinating western history. In 2003, Prospect Bowl, an extension to the ski area opened, providing the resort with many new trails and runs. In 2007–08, the ski area opened some of the most extreme, inbound, hike-to terrain in the country. Most lifts in the area are high-speed quad chairs capable of holding four passengers. The highest lift on the mountain reaches .

Telluride has a free box that is well supported by the community.

Geography
From the west, Colorado Route 145 is the most common way into Telluride; two other passes enter the town, Imogene Pass and Black Bear Pass.

On the eastern side of town, there are two waterfalls: Ingram Falls, which is visible from town, and Bridal Veil Falls and the Bridal Veil Hydroelectric plant, which are just out of sight from town to the right of Ingram. The power plant house was leased for some time by Eric Jacobson, who restored the house and the generator inside. The hydroelectric plant was built in 1895 to power the Smuggler-Union Mine.

The town is served by air transportation via Telluride Regional Airport (TEX), once the highest elevation commercial airport in the United States at 9,070 feet. The airport is considered challenging by pilots because of frequent adverse weather conditions, high elevation, and the extremely rugged mountain terrain surrounding the airport on nearly all sides.

Climate
Telluride has a humid continental climate (Dfb). The coldest month is January, averaging , and the hottest July, which averages . Precipitation peaks as snow in winter and as thunderstorms in summer with a dry period in late spring. Telluride gets moderate precipitation all year due to its altitude, averaging  of water equivalent precipitation, including  inches of snow, each year.

Demographics 

As of the census of 2000, there were 2,221 people, 1,013 households, and 357 families residing in the town. The population density was 3,143.3 people per square mile (1,207.8/km). There were 1,938 housing units at an average density of 2,742.8 per square mile (1,053.9/km). The racial makeup of the town was 92.57% White, 0.81% Native American, 0.72% Asian, 0.41% African American, 4.14% from other races, and 1.35% from two or more races. Hispanic or Latino of any race were 7.20% of the population.

There were 1,013 households, out of which 19.1% had children under the age of 18 living with them, 25.2% were married couples living together, 6.1% had a female householder with no husband present, and 64.7% were non-families. 31.9% of all households were made up of individuals, and 1.6% had someone living alone who was 65 years of age or older. The average household size was 2.19 and the average family size was 2.79.

In the town, the population was spread out, with 14.3% under the age of 18, 12.2% from 18 to 24, 50.9% from 25 to 44, 20.8% from 45 to 64, and 1.9% who were 65 years of age or older. The median age was 31 years. For every 100 females, there were 122.8 males. For every 100 females aged 18 and over, there were 127.4 males.

The median income for a household in the town was $51,938, and the median income for a family was $66,136. Males had a median income of $35,329 versus $30,096 for females. The per capita income for the town was $38,832. About 8.5% of families and 11.5% of the population were below the poverty line, including 16.2% of those under age 18 and 6.9% of those aged 65 or over.

Tourism

Beyond the ski lifts, Telluride is now widely recognized as an all-season resort. Telluride Ski Resort is the main attraction in the winter. But when summer comes around, Telluride transforms into an outdoor recreation hot spot, with tourists visiting to enjoy mountain biking, hiking, river rafting, sightseeing, and more. The Telluride Tourism Board promotes tourism in the region.

Telluride features over 30 hiking trails ranging in difficulty level. Some of the hiking routes include Ajax Peak, Bear Creek Falls, Hope Lake, and Bridal Veil Falls. Hiking season begins in May and lasts until early October, with waterfalls gushing in June and wildflowers at their peak in early July. Nearly all the trails feature waterfalls, wildflowers, and high alpine lakes.

Telluride is also home to many endurance events. The Imogene Pass Run from Ouray to Telluride, the Hardrock 100, held in July, has a major aid station in the town park. The Fall Tilt, a 12-hour downhill mountain biking event, is held in Mountain Village each September. And the  Telluride Mountain Run loops the town in a wide swath that includes some of the most difficult and scenic trails in the area.

Transportation
Telluride is served by Telluride Regional Airport. Scheduled flight options are limited, due to the airport's somewhat short runway and frequent closures under bad weather, so most passengers going to Telluride use Montrose Regional Airport,  to the north.

Free public transportation is provided in Telluride. The bus system called Galloping Goose, makes a complete loop around the town, and the Gondola links Telluride with Mountain Village. The Galloping Goose loops around every 20 minutes from 7 a.m. to 9 p.m. It stops at major locations such as the Gondola, the Post Office, and the Courthouse.

Telluride's free Gondola is the only one of its kind in North America. It stops at three stations, namely Telluride, San Sophia, and Mountain Village, and was the first leg of a transportation agreement for the Telluride Region that was stipulated as part of the Mountain Village zoning expansion that would provide free gondola service from the Town of Telluride and the Mountain Village to the Aldasoro Development, the West Meadows Development, the Valley Floor Development, and the West Meadows Development to virtually eliminate the use or need for a car in the Telluride Region of San Miguel County. The gondola cabins feature bike and ski racks for recreational use. There are also pet-friendly and handicap-accessible cabins available. The Gondola is open from 6:30 a.m. to midnight during the summer and winter seasons. It closes for six weeks during the off-season.

Regional bus service is provided by the San Miguel Authority for Regional Transportation (SMART).

Telluride is part of Colorado's Bustang intercity bus service network. It is on the Durango-Grand Junction Outrider line.
Major highways
 State Highway 145 is part of the San Juan Skyway. It connects Telluride to Cortez and Naturita. This road also gives access to State Highway 62, the main route to Denver, Montrose and other important places in Colorado.

Mountain passes
There are two alternate passes to enter the town, namely Imogene Pass and Black Bear Pass. Both require high clearance or four-wheel-drive vehicles.

In popular culture

The production of  The Hateful Eight directed by Quentin Tarantino began filming near Telluride in January 2015.

The Kia Telluride vehicle is named after the town.

In Justin Cronin's 2010 novel The Passage, Telluride is the site of a secret military compound used to test a purported "longevity drug" on death row inmates.

Kate Wolf's song "Telluride" imagines a woman reminiscing over her life working and living in Telluride and her childhood friend who left the region.

The Coen brothers 2018 film The Ballad of Buster Scruggs used Telluride as a filming location for the vignette "All Gold Canyon", based on a short story by Jack London.

See also

Outline of Colorado
Index of Colorado-related articles
State of Colorado
Colorado cities and towns
Colorado municipalities
List of counties in Colorado
Mountainfilm in Telluride
Telluride Daily Planet
Media:
Real World/Road Rules Challenge: The Gauntlet
Telluride Sessions
Live at the Telluride Bluegrass Festival

References

Further reading

External links

 
County seats in Colorado
Mining communities in Colorado
San Juan Mountains (Colorado)
Towns in Colorado